Carrizo Hill is a census-designated place (CDP) in Dimmit County,  in the U.S. state of Texas, United States. The population was 582 at the 2010 census.

History
The town was established in 2000.

Geography
Carrizo Hill is located at  (28.503386, -99.827670).

The community is located on US Route 83 and is adjacent to the Dimmit County Airport.

Demographics
As of the census of 2000, there were 548 people, 154 households, and 135 families residing in the CDP. The population density was 1,131.1 people per square mile (440.8/km2). There were 185 housing units at an average density of 381.9/sq mi (148.8/km2). The racial makeup of the CDP was 82.30% White, 0.55% African American, 0.73% Native American, 0.36% Asian, 14.23% from other races, and 1.82% from two or more races. Hispanic or Latino of any race were 93.25% of the population.

There were 154 households, out of which 57.1% had children under the age of 18 living with them, 71.4% were married couples living together, 11.0% had a female householder with no husband present, and 11.7% were non-families. 9.7% of all households were made up of individuals, and 5.2% had someone living alone who was 65 years of age or older. The average household size was 3.56 and the average family size was 3.82.

In the CDP, the population was spread out, with 39.4% under the age of 18, 10.2% from 18 to 24, 25.0% from 25 to 44, 20.3% from 45 to 64, and 5.1% who were 65 years of age or older. The median age was 26 years. For every 100 females, there were 106.0 males. For every 100 females age 18 and over, there were 93.0 males.

The median income for a household in the CDP was $14,167, and the median income for a family was $17,273. Males had a median income of $23,750 versus $14,861 for females. The per capita income for the CDP was $22,860. About 50.8% of families and 42.6% of the population were below the poverty line, including 29.1% of those under age 18 and 66.7% of those age 65 or over.

Education
Carrizo Hill is served by the Carrizo Springs Independent School District.

References

Census-designated places in Dimmit County, Texas
Census-designated places in Texas